J. Howard Entwisle (1865–1901) was an American songwriter and music compiler who wrote the music to the well-known Gospel song "Keep on the Sunny Side" (1899) with lyrics by Ada Blenkhorn. He also wrote "Beautiful Home" and the "Hallelujah Side," which have been recorded by several notable artists.

J. Howard Entwisle was born in 1865 in Pennsylvania and was living in Chester, Pennsylvania in 1880 where his father worked as a painter and paper hanger, and Entwisle had several older siblings. Entiwsle's father emigrated from England before his birth and his mother was a Delaware native, and as an adult Howard Entisle was married to Franciscah and had at least one child who died young. In the 1890s Entwisle worked as a musician and editor of songbooks in Philadelphia, Pennsylvania where he "collaborated with William J Kirkpatrick, also of Philadelphia, promoting gospel songs". While in Philadelphia Entisle "helped compile “Songs of love and praise #4” [1897], then later “Songs of love and praise #5” [1898]. Other published works were: “Bright melodies” (1899), “Heavenly sunlight” (1900), “Exalted praise” (1901)." He died in Philadelphia on December 16, 1901, at age thirty-six of small pox and was buried in the Laurel Hill Cemetery.

References

People from Philadelphia
American Christian hymnwriters
1865 births
1901 deaths